Degrassi (season 3) may refer to:

Degrassi Junior High (season 3) airing 1988-1989
Degrassi: The Next Generation (season 3), airing 2003–2004, renamed Degrassi in 2010